Dirk Kuhnen is a retired German rugby player, who played prop for the German national team from 1988 to 1998. He was the regular captain of Germany from 1995 to 1998.

Kuhnen was a member of German teams which toured Canada in 1988, competed in the erstwhile FIRA Tournaments and Rugby World Cup qualification matches. He also played for Germany in the Malaysia Tens.

He played club rugby for TSV Victoria Linden in Hanover, with whom he played in numerous German Championship finals, winning the Championship six times.

Honours

Club
 German Championship 1987, 1989, 1992, 1993, 1994, 1996 (all with TSV Victoria Linden)

References 

Living people
German rugby union players
Germany international rugby union players
TSV Victoria Linden players
DSV 78 Hannover players
Rugby union props
Sportspeople from Hanover
Year of birth missing (living people)